At Last! is the debut studio album by American blues and soul artist Etta James. Released on Argo Records in November 1960 the album was produced by Phil and Leonard Chess. At Last! also rose to no. 12 upon the Billboard Top Catalog Albums chart.

At Last! was ranked at #191 on Rolling Stones 500 Greatest Albums of All Time. It was ranked as the 62nd best album of the 1960s by Pitchfork.

History
The original release of At Last! was issued as a 12-inch LP consisting of ten tracks, five songs on each side of the LP. Phil and Leonard Chess believed that James's voice had crossover pop potential, so with this debut album, they backed her with orchestral arrangements on many of the tracks. At Last! eventually spawned four singles being "All I Could Do Was Cry", "Trust in Me", "At Last", and "My Dearest Darling". The album also included covers of pop and jazz standards, such as "Stormy Weather", "A Sunday Kind of Love", and "I Just Want to Make Love to You". In 1987, the album was released for the first time by MCA/Chess, and then digitally remastered and reissued on compact disc in 1999 with four bonus duet tracks performed with Harvey Fuqua: "My Heart Cries," "Spoonful," "It's a Crying Shame," and "If I Can't Have You."

Covers
The album's title track has been covered by artistes such as Stevie Wonder, Beyoncé, Joni Mitchell, Leela James, Cyndi Lauper, Randy Crawford, Celine Dion, Connie Wilson and Christina Aguilera. "All I Could Do Was Cry" was covered by both Beyoncé and Gladys Knight & The Pips.

A Simlish version of the title track was also made for the reveal trailer of The Sims 4's eleventh game pack, "My Wedding Stories".

Critical reception
Since its release, At Last! has been praised by many music critics. Stephen Cook of AllMusic gave the album five out of five stars, and, about James, wrote, "one hears the singer at her peak in a swinging and varied program of blues, R&B, and jazz standards." Cook also praised the material that was recorded for the album, saying that At Last! had "strong material throughout." He also went on to say that James's voice, "expertly handles jazz standards like "Stormy Weather" and "A Sunday Kind of Love," as well as Willie Dixon's blues classic "I Just Want to Make Love to You." James demonstrates her keen facility on the title track in particular, as she easily moves from powerful blues shouting to more subtle, airy phrasing; her Ruth Brown-inspired, bad-girl growl only adds to the intensity."

The writer for Rolling Stone exclaimed, "James bloomed into a fiery interpreter on this spellbinding LP."

Commercial response 
At Last! rose to no. 12 upon the Billboard Top Catalog Albums chart. Of the album's singles, "At Last," "All I Could Do Was Cry," "Trust in Me," and "My Dearest Darling"   rose to nos. 2, 2, 4 & 5 upon the Billboard Hot R&B Songs chart respectively. As a single, "At Last" was also certified gold by the RIAA.

Track listing 
Side one

Side two

Bonus tracks on 1999 CD reissue

Personnel
Etta James – vocals
Harvey Fuqua – vocals
Leonard Chess – producer
Phil Chess – producer
Riley Hampton – arranger, conductor
Don Kamerer – liner notes
Don Bronstein - cover

Charts

Weekly charts

Singles

References

1960 debut albums
Albums produced by Leonard Chess
Albums produced by Phil Chess
Argo Records albums
Chess Records albums
Etta James albums
MCA Records albums